Roxanne Pulitzer (née Renckens) is an American novelist.

Marriages
Her first husband was Peter Dixon, whom she left while they were living in South Florida.

She married Palm Beach-based newspaper heir Herbert "Peter" Pulitzer (heir to Pulitzer, Inc.) and their twin sons Maclean Simpson Pulitzer ("Mac") and Zachary Simpson Pulitzer ("Zac") were born in 1978. They divorced in 1983.

In 1992, she married again, to speedboat racer John Haggin Jr. Their marriage ended after 8 weeks.

 she was married to Timothy S. Boberg and resided in Palm Beach.

Literary and media career
Pulitzer is the author of an autobiography, Prize Pulitzer: The Scandal That Rocked Palm Beach, and the novels Facade, Twins and The Palm Beach Story. Her autobiography was later adapted into a made-for-television movie, Roxanne: The Prize Pulitzer, written from her point of view. She also appeared on the June 1985 cover and interior of Playboy Magazine. The $70,000 she received was used to pay her divorce bills.

References

External links

Living people
20th-century American novelists
American women novelists
Novelists from Florida
20th-century American women writers
21st-century American women
Year of birth missing (living people)